Albert Eduard Kusnets (12 August 1902 – 1942) was a middleweight Greco-Roman wrestler from Estonia. He competed in the 1924 and 1928 Summer Olympics and placed fourth and third, respectively. He won his 1928 bronze medal despite breaking a leg in 1928 and not competing until the Olympics. He earned three more medals at the European championships in 1927–1933. Kusnets missed the 1932 Olympics, because Estonia could not afford sending a team to Los Angeles during the Great Depression. After retiring in 1933 he worked as wrestling coach, and prepared the Olympic champion Kristjan Palusalu. 

In 1941, he was sent to a Russian labor camp in Arkhangelsk Oblast, where he starved to death the next winter.

References

External links
 

1902 births
1942 deaths
Wrestlers at the 1924 Summer Olympics
Wrestlers at the 1928 Summer Olympics
Estonian male sport wrestlers
Olympic wrestlers of Estonia
Olympic bronze medalists for Estonia
Olympic medalists in wrestling
Medalists at the 1928 Summer Olympics
Deaths by starvation
Estonian people who died in Soviet detention
People who died in the Gulag
People from Kambja Parish
European Wrestling Championships medalists
20th-century Estonian people